John Franklin Crowell (November 1, 1857 – August 6, 1931) served as president of Trinity College, the predecessor of Duke University, from 1887 to 1894. Crowell studied economics at Yale University, Columbia University and the University of Berlin. Crowell is primarily known for overseeing Trinity's movement to Durham, North Carolina and for reforming Trinity's curriculum, along with Joseph L. Armstrong, to be more in line with the German research university model. Toward that end Crowell persuaded the competing student literary societies to combine their libraries into a single college collection, where he personally catalogued the books and kept hours at a reference desk to encourage proper research methods. He also corrected the Latin in the college motto. Crowell increased the number of visiting lecturers at Trinity, and helped establish several academic student publications, one of which, the literary magazine The Archive is the second oldest such publication in the United States. Crowell also served as the head coach of the football program from 1888–1889, compiling a 3–2 record. After resigning from Duke, Crowell became head of the Department of Economics and Sociology at Smith College. He received an honorary LL.D. degree from Trinity in 1917.

Head coaching record

References

External links
 Men of Mark in America Biography & Portrait
 

1857 births
1931 deaths
American economists
American sociologists
Duke Blue Devils football coaches
Presidents of Duke University
Sportspeople from York, Pennsylvania